"The Key" is a song by Speech Debelle, released as the second single from the album Speech Therapy. The album won the 2009 Mercury Prize.

Critical reception
Tareck Ghoneim of Contactmusic.com commented that the song highlights "her unique voice and MC flow as well as her insightful and reflective lyrics" while using a clarinet to create "a truly refreshing and sophisticated sound that is street to the high street."

Track listings
UK CD single 
 "The Key" (Radio Edit) - 2:58

iTunes single 
 "The Key" - 3:01
 "The Key" (Instrumental) - 2:59

Nominations

References

Speech Debelle songs
2009 singles
2009 songs
Big Dada singles